The Allentown Parking Authority is responsible for both off and on-street parking within the City of Allentown, Pennsylvania.

The Allentown Parking Authority owns and manages five parking garages in downtown/center city, Allentown and leases 29 surface lots plus one parking ramp which make up a total of over 4,020 parking spaces.

The Allentown Parking Authority is responsible for the enforcement of both City and State parking regulations, by way of parking tickets, towing, wheel booting and/or impounding vehicles.

The Allentown Parking Authority currently regulates 1,500+ parking meters.

Criticisms 
Residents have criticized the Allentown Parking Authority for targeting low-income families living in center city Allentown by way of excessive fines and unnecessary meter parking. The Allentown Parking Authority has also been criticized for disrupting commerce in Allentown’s downtown shopping district by overzealously ticketing during standard business hours and unnecessary meter parking.

The Allentown Parking Authority has also been criticized for indirectly implementing a so-called ticketing quota" by budgeting its operations via revenue generated by ticketing vehicles

The Allentown Parking Authority has also been criticized for wasteful spending and flaunting its high-priced "Parking Enforcement Technology" while public schools in the Allentown School District are perceived as under-funded

In December 2009, the website brokenladders.com called the Allentown Parking Authority a "corrupt, wasteful, hypocritical, nuisance" and launched a grassroots campaign to have the entity shut down.

References

External links 
 Allentown Parking Authority Website
 "The Allentown Parking Authority Monster", Molovinsky on Allentown, November 18, 2021

Organizations based in Allentown, Pennsylvania
Parking companies